Hilary S. Franz (born 1969/1970) is an American politician and conservation attorney serving as the 16th Washington State Commissioner of Public Lands since 2017. She is a member of the Democratic Party who was previously a member of the Bainbridge Island city council and was elected as commissioner in 2016.

Early life and education

Franz was born in the Pacific Northwest and raised in the area, graduating from St. Mary's Academy in Portland, Oregon, in 1988. She was a competitive ice skater for twelve years as a child and teenager, frequenting the same ice rinks as future Olympian Tonya Harding. Franz graduated from Smith College with a bachelor's degree in English language and government in 1992 and the Northeastern University School of Law with a juris doctor. She practiced as an attorney in the Seattle area from 1997 to 2011, specializing in environmental law and conservation.

Political career

Franz was elected to the Bainbridge Island city council in 2008 and served one term, during which she lobbied the state government for the establishment of the area's first open water marina at Eagle Harbor. After briefly considering a run for the Washington State House of Representatives, Franz joined Seattle-based conservation organization Futurewise as its director. She served on several regional conservation and land management boards, including committees of the Puget Sound Regional Council.

Franz announced her intention to run for State Commissioner of Public Lands in April 2016, looking to fill the seat of retiring commissioner Peter J. Goldmark. She received the early endorsement of Goldmark, as well as former King County Executive Ron Sims and the Bullitt Center. Franz finished second overall during the primary election, advancing to the general election alongside Republican candidate Steve McLaughlin and ahead of seven other Democrats. With the further endorsements of two former governors, U.S. Senator Patty Murray, and a coalition of environmental groups and unions, Franz won 53 percent of the vote in the general election but failed to win any counties in Eastern Washington.

Franz was sworn in as Commissioner of Public Lands on January 11, 2017. During the first year of her term, the Department of Natural Resources faced a minor wildfire season caused by prolonged heat similar to those of previous years. The state government prepared a new forest management plan to reduce the effectiveness of future wildfires by introducing new restoration measures and prescribed burns in Eastern Washington to thin out overgrown forests.

On August 19, 2017, a fish farm near Cypress Island in Skagit County accidentally released hundreds of thousands of Atlantic salmon.  Franz ordered an investigation into the farm and announced that the farm would be removed for various violations of its state license and lease agreement. Franz was also part of the state government's effort to halt federal plans for offshore drilling in the Pacific Ocean near the Olympic Peninsula.

The 2018 wildfire season was more severe than the previous year and prompted the state government to declare a state of emergency after the Department of Natural Resources had been overwhelmed in its response to 891 fires by late July. The season had 1,850 recorded fires, setting a new state record, and Franz issued a request to the state legislature for a $55 million budget to expand the department's fire-fighting resources. Franz proposed the hiring of 30 full-time wildland firefighters, the purchase of two helicopters, and the creation of a fire-training academy specifically for wildfires.

Under Franz, logging on DNR lands was allowed to increase in order to raise revenue for local government needs, which drew criticism from conservationists. A proposed sale of timber from Capitol State Forest in 2020 was reduced by the DNR after the discovery of old growth trees included in the sale.

Franz was re-elected Commissioner of Public Lands in 2020, defeating Sue Kuehl Pederson in the general election.

Personal life

Franz has three sons and lived on a farm in Bainbridge Island prior to being elected as commissioner. Her family owns a plot of forestland in Pierce County, Washington, which includes a habitat of Ponderosa pine that is uncommon west of the Cascade Range.

References

External links

Government website
Campaign website
 
 

21st-century American women
1960s births
American conservationists
Living people
Northeastern University School of Law alumni
People from Bainbridge Island, Washington
Smith College alumni
Washington (state) city council members
Washington (state) Commissioners of Public Lands
Washington (state) Democrats
Washington (state) lawyers
Women in Washington (state) politics
Women city councillors in Washington (state)